Suction is the third studio album by noise rock band Feedtime, released in 1989 by Rough Trade Records.

Track listing

Personnel 
Adapted from the Suction liner notes.

feedtime
Rick Johnson – vocals, guitar
Al Larkin – bass guitar
Tom Sturm – drums

Production
Dave Boyne – engineering
Butch Vig – production, mixing

Release history

References

External links 
 

1989 albums
Albums produced by Butch Vig
Feedtime albums
Rough Trade Records albums